Ayers Rock, officially known as Uluru/Ayers Rock, is a geological feature in Australia.

Ayers Rock may also refer to.

Ayers Rock, an island in Lake Moawhango, New Zealand 
Ayers Rock (band), an Australian rock band
Ayers Rock Airport, an airport in Australia
Archeological Site CA-INY-134, an archeological site in the United States also called Ayer's Rock Pictograph Site

See also
Ayers (disambiguation)